Santiago Navarro (17 October 1939 – 8 October 1993) was a Spanish basketball player. He competed in the men's tournament at the 1960 Summer Olympics.

References

External links
 

1939 births
1993 deaths
Spanish men's basketball players
Olympic basketball players of Spain
Basketball players at the 1960 Summer Olympics
Basketball players from Barcelona